Antiguraleus taranakiensis is an extinct species of sea snail, a marine gastropod mollusk in the family Mangeliidae.

A.G. Beu (2009) adopted Probebela for all the southern hemisphere taxa previously referred to Antiguraleus.

Description
The length of the shell attains 6 mm, its diameter 4 mm.

Distribution
This extinct marine species occurred on New Zealand in Late Middle Miocene-Late Miocene strata (Waiauan-Kapitean)

References

 Marwick J. (1926) 1926: New Tertiary Mollusca from North Taranaki. Transactions of the New Zealand Institute 56: 317–33
 Maxwell, P.A. (2009). Cenozoic Mollusca. pp. 232–254 in Gordon, D.P. (ed.) New Zealand inventory of biodiversity. Volume one. Kingdom Animalia: Radiata, Lophotrochozoa, Deuterostomia. Canterbury University Press, Christchurch.

taranakiensis
Gastropods described in 1954